The azure-rumped tanager or Cabanis's tanager (Poecilostreptus cabanisi) is a species of bird in the family Thraupidae. It is a local resident in humid broadleaf forests and adjacent plantations of the Pacific slope of western Guatemala and southern Chiapas, Mexico.

Description
Its plumage is mostly pale blue, with a purplish-blue crown, distinctive dark spots across the chest, dark lores and lower auriculars. The mantle is mottled greenish-blue and black. The wings and tail are black with blue edgings. The bill is gray with a dark tip. Cabanis's tanagers utter several sibilant vocalizations, hard trill and twitters.

The azure-rumped tanager is omnivorous, feeding on fruit and arthropods. In Guatemala, abundance was positively correlated with the density of Ficus aurea trees. Figs of that tree are a main food source. The nesting season ranges from April to September, during which azure-rumped tanagers move in pairs or family groups. Cooperative breeding has been reported. Outside the breeding season, larger flocks of up to 18 birds have been reported.

The azure-rumped tanager is Vulnerable because of deforestation to clear the way for coffee plantations. It is estimated that there are 8250–23250 birds left in Guatemala. For Chiapas, there is no recent estimate, but in the 1980s there were 112000 ha of suitable habitat, which is expected to be much smaller now due to a growing human population and increased pressure by agricultural activities

Its closest relative appears to be the similarly patterned grey-and-gold tanager.

Resources
Eisermann, K., & C. Avendaño. (2007) Lista comentada de las aves de Guatemala - Annotated checklist of the birds of Guatemala. Lynx Edicions, Barcelona, Spain.
Eisermann, K., S. Arbeiter, G. López, C. Avendaño, and J. de León Lux. (2011) Distribution, habitat use, and implications for the conservation of the globally threatened Azure-rumped Tanager Tangara cabanisi in Guatemala. Bird Conservation International 21 .
Eisermann, K., S. Arbeiter, G. López, C. Avendaño, J. de León Lux, A. Burge, A. de León Lux, & E. Buchán. (2011) Nesting ecology of the Endangered Azure-rumped Tanager (Tangara cabanisi) in Guatemala. Ornitología Neotropical 22: 39–57.
Eisermann, K., G. López, J. Berry, J. de León Lux, and A. Burge. (2011) Vocalisations and juvenile plumage of Azure-rumped Tanager Tangara cabanisi. Cotinga OL 33: 46–49.
 Gómez de Silva, H. (1997) Further observations on the nesting of the Azure-rumped Tanager. Bulletin British Ornithologists’ Club 117: 16–18.
Heath, M., & A. Long. (1991) Habitat, distribution and status of the Azure-rumped Tanager Tangara cabanisi in Mexico. Bird Conservation International 1: 223.254.
Hilty, S. L., & D. Simon. (1977) The Azure-rumped Tanager in Mexico with comparative remarks on the Gray-and-gold Tanager. Auk 94: 605–606.
Howell, S. N. G. & S. Webb (1995): A Guide to the Birds of Mexico and Northern Central America. Oxford University Press, Oxford & New York.
Isler, M. L., & P. R. Isler. (1999) The tanagers: natural history, distribution and identification. Smithsonian Institution Press, Washington, D.C.
Long, A. J., & M. F. Heath. (1994) Nesting ecology and helping behaviour in the Azure-rumped Tanager in Mexico. Condor 96: 1095–1099.

References

External links
BirdLife Species Factsheet.
Recent studies on Azure-rumped Tanager by PROEVAL RAXMU Bird Monitoring Program
Photograph of adult Azure-rumped Tanager

azure-rumped tanager
Birds of Guatemala
Birds of Mexico
azure-rumped tanager
Taxa named by Philip Sclater
Taxobox binomials not recognized by IUCN